Jeana is a genus of moths of the family Hepialidae. There are two described species, both endemic to Australia:
Jeana delicatula – Tasmania and Victoria
Jeana robiginosa – Tasmania

References

Hepialidae
Exoporia genera
Taxa named by Norman Tindale